The Alliance for Automotive Innovation is a Washington, D.C.-based trade association and lobby group whose members include international automobile and light duty truck manufacturers that build and sell products in the United States. In 2019, the Global Automakers merged with the Alliance of Automobile Manufacturers and became the Alliance for Automotive Innovation.

A predecessor group was founded in 1965 as the Automobile Importers of America for the purpose of sharing technical and regulatory information regarding the requirements for designing vehicles for sale in the United States. It later changed its name to the Association of International Automobile Manufacturers, providing advocacy services including lobbying, research and analysis, and legal representation for foreign manufacturers in the U.S. auto industry. Prominent issues in which the association has become involved include trade restrictions, emissions standards and safety regulations. In 2011 the organization's name was changed to Global Automakers.

History

A predecessor organization, the Automobile Importers of America (AIA) was formed in 1965 to provide member companies information on changes to U.S. state and federal automotive industry regulations. AIA evolved into the primary advocacy resource for many major vehicle importers in the 1970s, opposing trade restrictions and other protectionist laws and regulations that adversely impacted its members.

The 1973 oil crisis led to increased market share for imported vehicles, which were often more fuel-efficient. In response, Ford Motor Company and the United Auto Workers union accused importers of dumping and unfair trading, and took their claims to trade authorities. AIA represented the importers and had the case dismissed in 1975, arguing that other factors led to the market-share changes.

In the 1980s, international automobile companies that were traditionally importers began opening new manufacturing plants in the U.S., leading to an expansion in the organization's focus. In 1990 AIA changed its name to the Association of International Automobile Manufacturers (AIAM). In 2011, the AIAM changed its name to the Association of Global Automakers.

In 2012, there were 12 automaker members including Honda, Toyota, Nissan, Hyundai and Kia. In 2011, member companies employed 81,000 in the U.S. in production-facility investments totaling $45 billion. The association said its members accounted for 42% of all vehicles sold in the U.S and 34% of vehicles manufactured in the U.S. from January to September 2011.

John Bozzella became the association's president and CEO on April 1, 2014.  He was preceded by Michael J. Stanton who had held the role since 2006. Previously, the association was led by Ralph Millet (1965 to 1977), George Nield (1977 to 1992), Philip A. Hutchinson Jr. (1992 to 2000) and Tim MacCarthy (2000 to 2006).

In January 2020, the Global Automakers merged with the Alliance of Automobile Manufacturers as a new organization, the Alliance for Automotive Innovation.

Members of both groups became members of the Alliance, representing nearly every automotive manufacturer selling cars and light duty trucks in the US. The AAM’s membership included the so-called US “Big Three” and several major offshore vehicle makers; the Global Automakers were the US operations of foreign companies. Only Toyota belonged to both groups. The Alliance for Automotive Innovation also expanded its membership to include suppliers to the industry, high technology companies and startups in the automotive sector. The organization’s focus is artificial intelligence, imaging and sensing innovation and connectivity. Former Global Automakers' CEO John Bozzella became the CEO and President of the new organization, with AAM’s David Schwietert serving as Chief Policy Officer.

The Alliance provides information to policymakers on key issues affecting the automotive sector, support related state and national legislation, and offer industry-oriented content. To reinforce the “Innovation” nucleus of the organization’s new goals, the Alliance reported that in 2018, the automotive industry invested $US 125 billion in R&D and earned more than 5,000 global patents.

Members

The new organization has expanded its membership to include supplier partners, high technology associates, startups and other automotive-related associations.

In March 2022, the membership included:

Activities

The Alliance represents, advises and advocates for manufacturers of automobiles and light duty trucks in the United States. The alliance focuses on policy development specifically for reducing emissions, expanding the manufacture of electric vehicles and investing in safety technology.

Market and trade

The association helps its members formulate and defend positions against legislation and regulations that make participation in the US market more costly or difficult for automakers. In 1994, the association filed an amicus brief in support of a successful appeals decision against the classification of the Nissan Pathfinder as a cargo vehicle. The ruling opened the door to Japanese expansion in the US light truck market, in particular the growing sport utility vehicle (SUV) segment. During the 1990s, the association opposed a move by the Clinton administration to impose a 100% tariff on 13 luxury vehicles imported from Japan.

National leadership strategy

In December 2020, the Alliance issued a report with eight policy strategies designed to secure US competitiveness in automotive technologies. The strategies included: government incentives endorsing industry R&D, updating regulations on autonomous vehicles and safety systems, encouraging workforce training, consumer incentives, infrastructure investments in EV charging, and transitioning to EVs  for government fleets.

Fuel economy and emissions

On behalf of its members, the association develops and advances positions on fuel efficiency, greenhouse gas emissions and other regulations and standards. The association opposes allowing individual states to adopt standards more stringent than the federal standards for vehicle emissions and fuel economy. It supports the Obama administration's proposed changes to CAFE standards, which would require automakers to improve car mileage by 5 percent annually until 2025, aiming to reduce greenhouse gas pollution.

In 2007, the association brought a lawsuit against the state of California, attempting to establish that the state had no authority to regulate greenhouse gas emissions. The association's argument was that the only method to significantly reduce greenhouse gas emissions, primarily carbon dioxide, is by improving fuel economy and only the U.S. Department of Transportation has authority to establish a fuel economy standard, under federal energy legislation from 1975. As such, California's standards are preempted by federal law. California is able to set its own standards for tailpipe emissions, if it is granted a waiver by the Environmental Protection Agency (EPA) from preemption under the Clean Air Act, as it had begun regulation of air pollution before the EPA was established. The association also argued that if California and other states did have authority to regulate greenhouse gas emissions, that would force manufacturers to make vehicles using too many different standards, effectively raising the cost of cars and eliminating model choices. In December 2007, a district court judge ruled against the association's suit. The association appealed this decision. In February 2008, the association issued a statement supporting the EPA's decision not to issue the waiver that would be required for California to regulate greenhouse gas emissions from motor vehicles. The association's president, Michael Stanton, stated that its interest was not in resisting such regulation, but ensuring that uniform standards are set by the federal government. In 2009, the association stated its support for an agreement reached by the Obama administration to adopt a single national standard for fuel economy, which led to outstanding lawsuits being dropped.

Electric vehicles
In the third quarter of 2021, the Alliance reported that sales of electric vehicles reached six percent of all light-duty automotive sales, the highest volume of EV sales ever recorded at 187,000 vehicles. This was an 11%  increase in sales, as opposed to a 1.3% increase in gasoline and diesel-powered units. The report indicated that California was the US leader in EV with nearly 40% of US purchases, followed by Florida – 6%, Texas – 5% and New York 4.4%.

In August 2021, the Biden administration issued an executive order that called for half of new vehicles sold in 2030 in the US to be zero-emission. Affected cars include those that run on batteries, are hybrid gasoline-electric or fuel-cell (hydrogen-powered). The Alliance indicated its support for the order but suggested the US government had to invest in expanding charging stations around the country. When the order was issued, the US had 40,000+ active charging stations, a number estimated to be insufficient to power the growing number of EVs. Later that year, Biden put forth a strategy for building the network. In response, the Alliance developed a list of “Recommended attributes for charging stations” that provided data on charging rates, power grid requirements, costs to charge and layouts of the stations.

Fuel formulation

In late 2010, the association was part of a coalition of engine manufacturers who filed suit in the United States Court of Appeals to block the Environmental Protection Agency’s approval of an increase of the ethanol content of gasoline from 10 percent to 15 percent. The association expressed concerns that alcohol-blended fuel could cause damage or problems to engines that were not originally built to run on such fuels. The association noted that the Clean Air Act required producers of any new fuel or fuel additive to show that those fuels would not contribute to the failure of vehicles or engines to meet emissions standards. The association and other plaintiffs requested time to conduct studies assessing the impact of an increase in the ethanol content of gasoline on newer model automobiles and small engines.

The association and 30 other organizations—including Friends of the Earth, the National Black Chamber of Commerce and representatives of the small-engine and snack-food industries—recently signed a letter asking the House Committee on Science, Space and Technology to support a bill requiring more study and scientific evaluation before so-called E15 fuels are approved for consumer use.

Safety and consumer protection

New Car Assessment Program (NCAP)
In 2021, the alliance recommended that NHTSA update its New Car Assessment Program (NCAP) which provides safety data that focuses on new technologies and safety features to individuals buying new vehicles. Specifically AAI asked that NCAP be updated on a consistent, regular basis by offering insight into new safety technologies; that NCAP officials engage with stakeholders on these technologies at least once/year; that the program include a three-year update and review cycle for other safety programs like the Euro NCAP program; that NHTSA review the program regularly to determine its efficacy; and that the program’s rules be structured to remove regulatory barriers and red tape that might hinder technology.

In March 2022, NHTSA released its proposal to modernize the new-vehicle evaluation program (NCAP). The administration’s proposed new program contains four new technologies in driver assistance - driver blind spot detection and intervention, electronic lane-keeping, computerized emergency braking systems protecting pedestrians - and  It also recommends new, improved test procedures and criteria on a car’s performance for existing driver-assistance technology.  NHTSA also recommended a 10-year “…road map for future programs….” and is seeking input on a ranking apparatus for driver-assistance technologies.

ECE regulations
Together with the (now defunct) American Automobile Manufacturers Association, in the late 1990s Global Automakers advocated for U.S. regulators to begin recognizing some of the ECE Regulations, which are used instead of U.S. regulations throughout most of the world.

Distracted driving
The association advocates a ban on the use of hand-held devices to text or talk while driving as "an important part of vehicle crash prevention".

Right to Repair Act
The association opposes the Motor Vehicle Owners' Right to Repair Act, the name of several related proposed bills in both the United States Congress and state legislatures. According to the association, the bill's supporters want not only repair codes, but also design and manufacturing codes, which it argues is an effort by after-market parts makers to access the manufacturers' intellectual property, and is unnecessary as the information independent shops need for repairs is already available online.

Advanced driver assistance systems

In 2021, the organization proposed a set of driver-monitoring safety principles for vehicles equipped with advanced driver-assistance technology (ADAS) to make sure the technology is effective and safe.  ADAS offers driver-assist features like simultaneous lane-monitoring and adaptive cruise control. The alliance is counseling that consumers understand that driver-assist technology provides limited function but does not imply more capability and states that driver-monitoring should be a standard feature combined with the assist technology. NHTSA has not issued specific regulations. Vehicles that are “self-driving” are not sold by any existing manufacturers. Automakers do require all drivers to be alert and mentally and physically involved in the driving experience. The alliance is specifically advocating camera-based driver monitoring systems in vehicles equipped with ADAS to sense the attention drivers are paying to the act of driving. The drivers should be ready to take over manual control in the event ADAS systems do not perform properly.

Adaptive driving beam headlights
In October 2021, the Alliance recommended to the National Highway Traffic Safety Administration (NHTSA) that the administration settle on a new rule allowing adaptive driving beam (ADB) headlight technology in US vehicles.  In February 2022, NHTSA administrator Steven Cliff signed such a rule, satisfying a requirement from 2021’s infrastructure law, amending the Federal Motor Vehicle Safety Standard 108, a regulation covering lighting, reflective devices and signaling in cars.

Rear seat reminder
The Alliance notified car buyers that its members would make rear seat reminders standard on US vehicles by the model year 2025. The technology is important because of drivers leaving an unattended child in the back seat of a car where interior temperatures can rise 20° in 10 minutes, causing hypothermia. The size of a child’s body also indicates that a child can be affected by heat three to five times faster than an adult. Between 1990 and 2018, 889 children died of hypothermia after their caregiver forgot and left the child in a car. Some safety proponents found the alarm system insufficient because the system can reset when the car is shut down. They also state the system would  be inadequate in the 25% of childhood hypothermia deaths where the child climbed into an automobile alone.

See also
 Alliance of Automobile Manufacturers
 American Automotive Policy Council

References

External links
  
 

Organizations established in 1965
Trade associations based in the United States
Motor trade associations
Automobile associations in the United States